Prehistoric Asia refers to events in Asia during the period of human existence prior to the invention of writing systems or the documentation of recorded history. This includes portions of the Eurasian land mass currently or traditionally considered as the continent of Asia. The continent is commonly described as the region east of the Ural Mountains, the Caucasus Mountains, the Caspian Sea, Black Sea and Red Sea, bounded by the Pacific, Indian, and Arctic Oceans. This article gives an overview of the many regions of Asia during prehistoric times.

Origin of Asian hominids

Early hominids
About 1.8 million years ago, Homo erectus left the African continent. This species, whose name means "upright man", is believed to have lived in East and Southeast Asia from 1.8 million to 40,000 years ago. Their regional distinction is classified as Homo erectus sensu stricto. They are believed to have had a vegetarian diet with some meat. They had small brains, when compared to the later Homo sapiens and used simple tools.

The earliest human fossils found outside of Africa are skulls and mandibles of the Asian Homo erectus  from Dmanisi (modern Republic of Georgia) in Caucasus, which is a land corridor that led to North Asia from Africa and Near East or Middle East. They are approximately 1.8 Ma (Megaannum, or million years) old.  Archaeologists have named these fossils Homo erectus georgicus. There were also some remains that looked similar to the Homo ergaster, which may mean that there were several species living about that time in Caucasus. Bones of animals found near the human remains included short-necked giraffes, ostriches, ancient rhinoceroses from Africa and saber-toothed tigers and wolves from Eurasia. Tools found with the human fossils include simple stone tools like those used in Africa: a cutting flake, core and a chopper.

The oldest Southeast Asian Homo fossils, known as the Homo erectus Java Man, were found between layers of volcanic debris in Java, Indonesia. Fossils representing 40 Homo erectus individuals, known as Peking Man, were found near Beijing at Zhoukoudian that date to about 400,000 years ago. The species was believed to have lived for at least several hundred thousand years in China, and possibly until 200,000 years ago in Indonesia. They may have been the first to use fire and cook food.

Skulls were found in Java of Homo erectus that dated to about 300,000 years ago. A skull was found in Central China that was similar to the Homo heidelbergensis remains that were found in Europe and Africa and are dated  between 200,000 and 50,000 years ago.

Homo sapiens
Between 60,000 and 100,000 years ago, Homo sapiens came to Southeast Asia and Australia by migrating from Africa, known as the "Out of Africa" model. Homo sapiens are believed to have migrated through the Middle East on their way out of Africa about 100,000 years ago. Near Nazareth, remains of skeletons, including a double grave of a mother and child, dating to about 93,000 years ago were found in a Jebel Qafzeh cave. Included among the remains was a skeleton of another species which was not Homo sapiens; it had a "distinct and undivided browridge that is continuous across the eye sockets" and other discrepancies.

Researchers believe that the modern human, or Homo sapiens, migrated about 60,000 years ago to South Asia along the Indian Ocean, because people living in the most isolated areas of the Indian Ocean have the oldest non-African DNA markers. Humans migrated into inland Asia, likely by following herds of bison and mammoth and arrived in southern Siberia by about 43,000 years ago and some people moved south or east from there. By about 40,000 years ago Homo sapiens made it to Malaysia, where a skull was found on Borneo in Niah Cave.

They were omnivorous. As compared to earlier hominids, Homo sapiens had larger brains and used more complex tools, including, blades, awls, and microliths out of antlers, bones and ivory. They were the only hominids to develop language, make clothes, create shelters, and store food underground for preservation. In addition, language was formed, rituals were created, and art was made.

Prehistory by region

North Asia

Above China is North Asia, in which Siberia, and Russian Far East are extensive geographical regions which has been part of Russia since the seventeenth century.

At the southwestern edge of North Asia is Caucasus. It is a region at the border of Europe and Asia, situated between the Black and the Caspian seas. Caucasus is home to the Caucasus Mountains, which contain Europe's highest mountain, Mount Elbrus. The southern part of the Caucasus consists of independent sovereign states, whereas the northern parts are under the jurisdiction of the Russian Federation.

The Armenian Highland, in Prehistoric Armenia, shows traces of settlement from the Neolithic era. The Shulaveri-Shomu culture of the central Transcaucasus region is one of the earliest known prehistoric culture in the area, carbon-dated to roughly 6000–4000 BC.  Another early culture in the area is the Kura-Araxes culture, assigned to the period of ca. 3300–2000 BC, succeeded by the Georgian Trialeti culture (ca. 3000–1500 BC).

The prehistory of Georgia is the period between the first human habitation of the territory of modern-day nation of Georgia and the time when Assyrian and Urartian, and more firmly, the Classical accounts, brought the proto-Georgian tribes into the scope of recorded history.

Central Asia

Central Asia is the core region of the Asian continent and stretches from the Caspian Sea in the west to China in the east and from Afghanistan in the south to Russia in the north. It is also sometimes referred to as Middle Asia, and, colloquially, "the 'stans" (as the six countries generally considered to be within the region all have names ending with the Persian suffix "-stan", meaning "land of") and is within the scope of the wider Eurasian continent. The countries are Kazakhstan, Kyrgyzstan, Tajikistan, Turkmenistan, Uzbekistan, and Afghanistan.

East Asia
East Asia, for the purpose of this discussion, includes the prehistoric regions of China, Taiwan, Tibet, Xinjiang and Korea. Study of Prehistoric China includes its paleolithic sites,  neolithic cultures, Chalcolithic cultures, the Chinese Bronze Age, and the Bronze Age sites.

Ancestral East Asians, which gave rise to modern East/Southeast Asians, Polynesians, Siberians and Native Americans, expanded in multiple waves outgoing from Southern China northwards and southwards respectively. Population genomic data suggest that Paleolithic East Asian show continuity to modern East Asians and related groups.

China
The earliest traces of early humans, Homo erectus, in East Asia have been found in China. Fossilized remains of Yuanmou Man were found in Yunnan province in southwest China and have been dated to 1.7 Ma. Stone tools from the Nihewan Basin of the Hebei province in northern China are 1.66 million years old.

Early humans were attracted to what was the warm, fertile climate of Central China more than 500,000 years ago. Skeletal remains of about 45 individuals, known collectively as Peking Man were found in a limestone cave in Yunnan province at Zhoukoudian. They date from 400,000 to 600,000 years ago and some researchers believe that evidence of hearths and artifacts means that they controlled fire, although this is challenged by other archaeologists. About 800 miles west of this site, near Xi'an in the Shaanxi province are remains of a hominid who lived earlier than Peking Man.

Between 100,000 and 200,000 years ago, humans lived in various places in China, such as Guanyindong in Guizhou, where they made Levallois stone artefacts. After 100,000 BCE, Homo sapiens lived in China and by 25,000 BCE the modern humans lived in isolated locations on the North China Plain, where they fished and hunted for food. They made artifacts of bone and shell.

Starting about 5000 BCE humans lived in Yellow River valley settlements were they farmed, fished, raised pigs and dogs for food, and grew millet and rice. Begun during the late Neolithic period, they were the earliest communities in China. Its artifacts include ceramic pots, fishhooks, knives, arrows and needles. In the northwest Shaanxi, Gansu and Henan provinces two cultures were established by about the sixth millennium BCE. They produced red pottery. Other cultures that emerged, that also made pottery, include the Bao-chi and Banpo people of Shaanxi and the Chishan people of Hebei.

The Yangshao people, who existed between 5000 and 2500 BCE, were farmers who lived in distinctive dwelling which were partly below the surface. Their pottery included designs which may have been symbols that later evolved into written language. Their villages were in western Henan, southwestern Shanxi and central Shaanxi. Between 2500 and 1000 BCE the Longshan culture existed in southern, eastern and northeastern China and into Manchuria. They had superior farming and ceramic making techniques to that of the Yangshao people and had ritualistic burial practices and worshiped their ancestors. Subsequent dynasties include the Xia, Shang, and Zhou dynasties, when the Old Chinese language developed.

Dates are approximate, consult particular article for details

Taiwan
The Prehistory of Taiwan ended with the arrival of the Dutch East India Company in 1624, and is known from archaeological finds throughout the island.  The earliest evidence of human habitation dates back 50,000 years or more, when the Taiwan Strait was exposed by lower sea levels as a land bridge.  Around 5000 years ago farmers from mainland China settled on the island.  These people are believed to have been speakers of Austronesian languages, which dispersed from Taiwan across the islands of the Pacific and Indian Oceans.  The current Taiwanese aborigines are believed to be their descendants.

Korea
Prehistoric Korea is the era of human existence in the Korean Peninsula for which written records did not exist. It, however, constitutes the greatest segment of the Korean past and is the major object of study in the disciplines of archaeology, geology, and palaeontology.

Japan
The study of Prehistoric Japan includes Japanese Paleolithic and Jōmon.

Near East

The Near East is a geographical term that roughly encompasses Western Asia. Despite having varying definitions within different academic circles, the term was originally applied to the maximum extent of the Ottoman Empire, but has since been gradually replaced by the term Middle East. The region is sometimes called the Levant.

At 1.4 million years, Ubeidiya in the northern Jordan River Valley is the earliest Homo erectus site in the Levant.

Dates are approximate, consult particular article for details

South Asia

South Asia is the southern region of the Asian continent, which comprises the sub-Himalayan countries and, for some authorities, also includes the adjoining countries to the west and the east. Topographically, it is dominated by the Indian Plate, which rises above sea level as the India south of the Himalayas and the Paropamisadae. South Asia is bounded on the south by the Indian Ocean and on land (clockwise, from west) by West Asia, Central Asia, East Asia, and Southeast Asia.

The Riwat site in Pakistan contains a few artifacts – a core and two flakes – that might date human activity there to 1.9 million years ago, but these dates are still controversial.

The South Asian prehistory is explored in the articles about Prehistoric Sri Lanka, India and Tamil Nadu

Dates are approximate, consult particular article for details

Southeast Asia
Southeast Asia is a subregion of Asia, consisting of the countries that are geographically south of China, east of India, west of New Guinea and north of Australia. The region lies on the intersection of geological plates, with heavy seismic and volcanic activity. Southeast Asia consists of two geographic regions: (1) Mainland Southeast Asia, also known as Indochina, comprising Cambodia, Laos, Myanmar (Burma), Thailand, and Vietnam; and (2) Maritime Southeast Asia, comprising Brunei, Malaysia, East Timor, Indonesia, Philippines, and Singapore.

The rich Sangiran Formation in Central Java (Indonesia) has yielded the earliest evidence of hominin presence in Southeast Asia. These Homo erectus fossils date to more than 1.6 Ma. Remains found in Mojokerto have been dated to 1.49 Ma.

Its history is told by region, including the Early history of Burma and Cambodia, as well as the articles about Prehistoric Philippines, Thailand, Malaysia and Indonesia.

It had a small brain and, nicknamed "the Hobbit" for its diminutive structure, was classified distinctly as Homo floresiensis. Evidence of H. floresiensis has been dated to be from 50,000 to 190,000 years ago, after early publications suggested the small hominid persisted until as recently as 12,000 years ago. Ancestral East Asians are suggested to have originated in Mainland Southeast Asia, before expanding northwards.

Written language

See also

 History of Asia
Domesticated plants and animals of Austronesia
 List of archaeological sites by continent and age
 Prehistoric Europe
 Prehistory
 Timeline of prehistory

Notes

References

Works cited
.
.
.
.
.
.